Io sto bene (English: I'm Fine) is a 2020 Luxembourgian drama film directed by Donato Rotunno. It was selected as the Luxembourgian entry for the Best International Feature Film at the 94th Academy Awards.

Cast
 Renato Carpentieri as Antonio
 Sara Serraiocco as Leo

See also
 List of submissions to the 94th Academy Awards for Best International Feature Film
 List of Luxembourgish submissions for the Academy Award for Best International Feature Film

References

External links
 

2020 films
2020 drama films
Luxembourgian drama films
Luxembourgish-language films